Gubin is a village in the city of Livno in Canton 10, the Federation of Bosnia and Herzegovina, Bosnia and Herzegovina.

History 

In June 1941, on the Eastern Orthodox Pentecost, Ustaše from Livno raided the village. The Ustashe carried out atrocities in the region. Several locals joined the 4th Krajina Brigade of the Yugoslav Partisans.
The village was completely destroyed by Croat forces during and after the Yugoslav wars, but organisations such as the United Methodist Church have raised funds to help rebuild the village. The local Serb population fled to Serbia in 1995 amid Operation Storm. A small number has since returned.

Demographics 

According to the 1991 census, there were 366 inhabitants in the village, out of whom 361 were Serbs.

According to the 2013 census, its population was 91

Footnotes

Bibliography 

 

Villages in Bosnia and Herzegovina
Serb communities in the Federation of Bosnia and Herzegovina